Puwersa ng Bayaning Atleta also known as the PBA Partylist is a political organization which had partylist representation in the House of Representatives of the Philippines. It aims to represent the interest of Filipino sportspeople.

History
The PBA Partylist ran in the 2007 elections but failed to win a seat.

In the 2010 elections, it was endorsed by professional boxer Manny Pacquiao who was also the organization's chair at the time. During the 15th Congress, the PBA field a bill proposing the creation of a Department of Sports but the proposal did not become law due to a lack of time.

The PBA Partylist lost representation in the Congress after it failed to secure at least a seat in the 16th Congress in the 2013 elections. The group regained representation in the following Congress after it garnered enough votes to win two seats in the House of Representatives.

References

Party-lists represented in the House of Representatives of the Philippines